Michael Edward Peskin (born October 27, 1951, Philadelphia) is an American theoretical physicist. He was an undergraduate at Harvard University and obtained his Ph.D. in 1978 at Cornell University studying under Kenneth Wilson. He was a Junior Fellow at the Harvard Society of Fellows from 1977–1980.

He is currently a professor in the theory group at the SLAC National Accelerator Laboratory. Peskin was elected to the American Academy of Arts and Sciences in 2000.

Peskin is known for a widely used textbook on quantum field theory, written with Daniel V. Schroeder and published in 1995, and the Peskin–Takeuchi parameter. He has authored many popular review articles. He is a noted advocate of building a future linear collider.

Bibliography
 Michael E. Peskin and Daniel V. Schroeder, An Introduction to Quantum Field Theory, Addison-Wesley, Reading, 1995.

References

 Official website

21st-century American physicists
New Trier High School alumni
Harvard University alumni
Cornell University alumni
Stanford University SLAC faculty
Living people
1951 births
Fellows of the American Academy of Arts and Sciences